Puchong Prima LRT station is a Light Rapid Transit station at Puchong Prima, a township in Puchong, Petaling District, Selangor, Malaysia. It is served by the LRT Sri Petaling Line, which is situated between the terminus of the line, Putra Heights station and Puchong Perdana station.

Like most LRT station operating in Klang Valley, the station is an elevated station, which consists of two side platforms. It is connected to street level by escalators, lifts and stairs. A pedestrian bridge over Persiaran Puchong Permai connects the station to the shops nearby, as well as a local supermarket. The station was built as part of the Sri Petaling Line extension, which began construction in 2010  and opened on 30 June 2016.

The station is near OTK supermarket, Taman Puchong Prima, Desa Idaman, Pangsapuri Lili, Pangsapuri Elina, as well as a secondary school. Other than that, the station also serves residences from Bukit Puchong, Taman Tasik Prima, Meranti Jaya, Taman Puchong Permai and several other residential areas.

History 
The extension of both Sri Petaling Line and Kelana Jaya Line were announced on 29 August 2006 by then Malaysian Deputy Prime Minister Mohd Najib Abdul Razak. This is also confirmed by then Prime Minister of Malaysia Tun Abdullah Badawi in his National Budget speech in 2006.

The extension project, worth RM955.84 million, was awarded to a joint venture (JV) consortium of George Kent (M) Bhd and its partner Lion Pacific Sdn Bhd. Although it faced some delays, the station was opened on 30 June 2016, along with the rest of the stations in the Sri Petaling Line extension and Kelana Jaya Line extension.

Residence nearby had complained that the viaduct that supports the elevated railway are blocking the views of motorist at a three-way junction in Jalan Prima 1, causing accidents to happen frequently.

Station

Station layout 
Due to the lack of space, a drop off spot was built instead of a park-and-ride facilities. Two convenience store, operated by Mynews.com and 7-Eleven can be found in the station, as well as a Pos Laju Kiosk Outlet. The entire station is disabled-friendly, with accessibility lifts, accessible toilets, special faregate for wheelchair users and tactile paving provided throughout the station. The trains and station platforms are level with one another, with a minimal gap between the two. This allows for easy boarding with a wheelchair.

Green Infrastructure 
As part of a green initiative, the station includes various green practices. Energy-efficient lights and rainwater harvesting systems were installed throughout station. Windows were designed to allow sunlight into the stations. The construction of the station utilized sustainable materials and recycling practices.

Entrances and Exits

Bus Services

Feeder buses

Other buses

Notes

References

External links 
Puchong Prima LRT Station

Ampang Line
Railway stations opened in 2016